Faina Kirschenbaum (born 27 November 1955) is an Israeli politician who served as a member of the Knesset for Yisrael Beiteinu between 2009 and 2015. In July 2021 she was sentenced to ten years in prison following a conviction for bribery.

Life and career
Born in Lviv in the Ukrainian SSR of the Soviet Union (today in Ukraine), Kirschenbaum made aliyah to Israel on 31 December 1973. She trained as a nurse at the Beilinson School of Nursing, as well as gaining a BA in general studies from Thames Valley University, an MBA from the University of Derby, a certificate in director's training at Bar-Ilan University.

In 1981 she moved to the Israeli settlement of Nili in the West Bank. She served as its council secretary, and was a member of Mateh Binyamin Regional Council. She has also served as deputy chairwoman of the Israeli branch of the World Jewish Congress, and as a member of the board of directors of the Museum of the Jewish Diaspora.

The party's director general, prior to the 2009 elections she was placed tenth on the Yisrael Beiteinu list and entered the Knesset as the party won 15 seats. Together with Likud MK Danny Danon she proposed the controversial law to set up two parliamentary panels of inquiry into left-wing human rights and anti-occupation Israeli  NGOs. After several month-long discussion in Knesset and Israeli press, the law, opposed by Prime Minister Benjamin Netanyahu and opposition leader Tzipi Livni, was voted against by Knesset.

She was re-elected in 2013, and joined the new government as Deputy Minister of Internal Affairs on 18 March 2013. Kirschenbaum retired from politics in January 2015 after a police investigation into corruption.

Kirschenbaum is married with three children.

Corruption trial
Kirschenbaum was one of several senior government officials arrested in December 2014 on charges of bribery, fraud, and breach of trust. Her trial at the Tel Aviv District Court opened in September 2017, during which she pled not guilty to all charges. In March, 2021 she was found guilty of breach of trust, bribery, fraud, money laundering and tax offences, with the court ruling that she had accepted bribes from eight sources over six years. In July 2021 the Tel Aviv District Court sentenced Kirschenbaum to ten years in prison and fined her NIS 900,000 ($274,000).

References

External links

1955 births
Living people
Alumni of the University of Derby
Alumni of the University of West London
Bar-Ilan University alumni
Deputy ministers of Israel
Israeli nurses
Israeli people of Ukrainian-Jewish descent
Israeli settlers
Women members of the Knesset
Members of the 18th Knesset (2009–2013)
Members of the 19th Knesset (2013–2015)
Soviet emigrants to Israel
Soviet Jews
Ukrainian Jews
Yisrael Beiteinu politicians
21st-century Israeli women politicians
Israeli politicians convicted of crimes